The three-line United Nations Security Council Resolution 338, adopted on October 22, 1973, called for a ceasefire in the Yom Kippur War in accordance with a joint proposal by the United States and the Soviet Union.  The resolution stipulated a cease fire to take effect within 12 hours of the adoption of the resolution. The "appropriate auspices" was interpreted to mean American or Soviet rather than UN auspices. This third clause helped to establish the framework for the Geneva Conference (1973) held in December 1973.

The resolution was passed at the 1747th UNSC meeting by 14 votes to none, with one member, the People's Republic of China, not participating in the vote. The fighting continued despite the terms called for by the resolution, brought Resolution 339 which resulted in a cease fire.

The resolution states:

Binding or non-binding issue
The alleged importance of resolution 338 in the Arab–Israeli conflict supposedly stems from the word "decides" in clause 3 which is held to make resolution 242 binding. However, the decision in clause 3 does not relate to resolution 242, but rather to the need to begin negotiations on a just and durable peace in the Middle East that led to the Geneva Conference which Syria did not attend.

The argument continues; Article 25 of the United Nations Charter says that UN members "agree to accept and carry out the decisions of the Security Council". It is generally accepted that Security Council resolutions adopted according to Chapter VII of the UN Charter in the exercise of its primary responsibility for the maintenance of international peace in accordance with the UN Charter are binding upon the member states.

Scholars applying this doctrine on the resolution assert that the use of the word "decide" makes it a "decision" of the Council, thus invoking the binding nature of article 25. The legal force added to Resolution 242 by this resolution is the reason for the otherwise puzzling fact that SC 242 and the otherwise seemingly superfluous and superannuated Resolution 338 are always referred to together in legal documents relating to the conflict.

The more obvious need for the use of Resolution 338 is that it requires all parties to cease fire and states when that should occur, without which Resolution 242 can't be accomplished.

Some scholars have advanced the position that the resolution was passed as a non-binding Chapter VI recommendation. Other commentators assert that it probably was passed as a binding Chapter VII resolution. The resolution contains reference to neither Chapter VI nor Chapter VII.

Adoption of the Resolution
Egypt and Israel accepted on October 22 Resolution conditions. Syria, Iraq, and Jordan rejected the Resolution.

Execution requirements of the Resolution by Egypt and Israel
An October 22 United Nations-brokered ceasefire quickly unraveled, with each side blaming the other for the breach.
According to some sources, Egypt broke the cease-fire first:
The cease fire soon violated because Egypt's Third Army Corps tried to break free of the Israeli Army's encirclement. The Egyptian action and the arrival of more Soviet equipment to Cairo permitted Israel to tighten its grip on the Egyptians
According to other sources, Israel broke the cease-fire first:

On October 22 the superpowers brokered UN Security Council Resolution 338. It provided the legal basis for ending the war, calling for a cease-fire to be in place within twelve hours, implementation of Resolution 242 'in all its parts' and negotiations between the parties. This marked the first occasion the Soviets had endorsed direct negotiations between the Arabs and Israel without conditions or qualifications. Golda Meir, the Israeli Ptine Minister, who was not consulted, was offended by this fait accompli, though she had little option but to comply.

Nevertheless, Meir was determined to gain the maximum strategic advantage before the final curtain came down on the conflict. Given the entanglement of the Egyptian and Israeli armies, the temptation was too great for the Israelis to resist. After a final push in the Sinai expelled the Egyptians, Meir gave the order to cross the Canal.

Israel's refusal to stop fighting after a United Nations cease-fire was in place on October 22 nearly involved the Soviet Union in the military confrontation.

Arab–Israeli peace diplomacy and treaties
 Faisal–Weizmann Agreement (1919)
 Paris Peace Conference, 1919
 1949 Armistice Agreements
 Camp David Accords (1978)
 Egypt–Israel peace treaty (1979)
 Madrid Conference of 1991
 Oslo Accords (1993)
 Israel–Jordan peace treaty (1994)
 Camp David 2000 Summit
 Israeli–Palestinian peace process
 Projects working for peace among Israelis and Arabs
 List of Middle East peace proposals
 International law and the Arab–Israeli conflict

See also
 Arab–Israeli conflict
 List of United Nations Security Council Resolutions 301 to 400 (1971–1976)
 United Nations Security Council Resolution 242

References

External links
 Text of the Resolution at undocs.org

 0338
 0338
Arab–Israeli peace process
Yom Kippur War
October 1973 events